Lakhpat is a town in Kachchh district in the Indian state of Gujarat located at the mouth of the Kori Creek. The town is enclosed by 7km-long, 18th century fort walls.

Etymology 
The town is named after Rao Lakha who ruled in Sindh about the middle of the thirteenth century.

History 

Historically Lakhpat has been a very important trading post connecting Gujarat to Sindh. The waters of the Sindhu river used to flow into Lakhpat and further on to Desalpar Gunthli. In historic times, Lakhpat had only one very short period of prosperity. Rice used to be cultivated there, which was the source of  800,000 Koris in annual revenue. It is also said that Lakhpat used to generate an income of 100,000 Koris everyday from maritime activities. Fateh Muhammad, about the close of the eighteenth century (1801), enlarged and rebuilt its wall, and for a time it was a center of trade in Sindh. Though he thought it one of the chief supports of his power, Lakhpat declared against Fateh Muhammad when he opposed the Rao of Cutch State in 1804. A few years later (1809), the commandant of the fort, Mohim Miyan, drove out the agents of Hansraj and governed the town on his own accounts. In 1818, Lakhpat had 15,000 people and yielded a yearly revenue of £6000 ( 60,000). After the earthquake of 1819 a natural dam known as the Allahbund was formed, and the Indus river changed its course of flow and started flowing into the Arabian sea further north. Thus Lakhpat lost its importance as a port. By 1820, the population reduced to 6000 inhabitants, consisting chiefly of mercantile speculators from other countries and families of Hindus that migrated from the Sindh province. The walls were in good repair, but the houses were ruined and did not fill one-third of the area. By 1851, all trade had left the town, and it has since remained poverty-stricken and half deserted. The population reduced to 2500 by 1880.

Today it is a sparsely populated ghost town, a city of ruins of buildings and a magnificent fort surrounding them. The population was 463 in 87 households 2001 which increased to 566 in 108 households in 2011.

During the period of Muslim rule, some Hindus who had not converted to Islam under the Ghaznavids moved to Vighokot and Lakhpat around 1028 AD from Sindh. They migrated to live peacefully under Jadeja Rajput Hindu rulers as the Samma Muslim rulers were oppressing them.

Places of interest

Fort
The fort, rebuilt and expanded in 1801 by Fateh Muhammad, is an irregular polygon, defended by round towers and built of hard brown stone. The 7km-long walls are of considerable height but not thick.

Pir Ghaus Muhammad tomb

Pir Ghaus Muhammad, a Sufi saint and Syyed of Lakhpat, half-Muslim and half-Hindu in his customs, who was believed to have supernatural power. Dying in 1855, his brother Bava Mia or Sa Saheb, from contributions made by Gosh Muhammad's followers, began to build a tomb locally known as Kubo. This tomb, of black stone, on a platform fifty-four feet square and seven high, rising in a conical dome 63 feet 3 inches high, is octagonal in shape, with four side doors arched and richly carved, and the walls decorated with patterns of flowers and leaves. Inside, the floor is paved with white and black marble, and the grave is covered with a white marble canopy. On the walls are passages from the Quran. It is still unfinished. The water tank opposite the tomb is believed to have healing characteristics for skin diseases.

Gurudwara Guru Nanak Darbar
500 years old gurudwara, part of world heritage sites.

Other
Sayyed Pir Shah Dargah has nine-domed with intricate carvings. Nani Mai Dargah, Hatkeshwar Temple amongst others in the old town are reminisces of the past.

BSF Post
The seaward side of the fort is guarded by Border Security Force (BSF) of India soldiers as it is not far away from international border between India and Pakistan marked in salt marsh land. There are BSF guards posted on the fort's fortifications and the nearby Border Outpost.

In popular culture
 The 2000 Hindi film Refugee directed by J P Dutta featured Lakhpat fort as a fictitious town located across the international border in neighboring Pakistan.

Gallery

References

 The article incorporates the Public Domain text from 
The quaint charm of Rann of Kutch; by P.Devarajan; 27 January 2000; Business Line, Financial Daily from THE HINDU group of publications

External links

Lakhpat on Gujarat Tourism department website
Between sun and superstition; 11 August 1999; EXPRESS NEWS SERVICE; The Indian Express
Border villagers set to get I-card; by Hiral Dave; 16 June 2009; The Indian Express

History of Gujarat
Ghost towns in India
Villages in Kutch district